Qatar Aghaj, also rendered as Ghatar Aghaj or Qatar Aqaj, may refer to:
 Qatar Aghaj, Fars
 Qatar Aghaj, Hamadan
 Qatar Aghaj, Markazi